Catherine Sarah Wood Marshall LeSourd (27 September 1914 – 18 March 1983) was an American author of nonfiction, inspirational, and fiction works. She was the wife of well-known minister Peter Marshall.

Biography
Marshall was born in Johnson City, Tennessee. She was the daughter of the Reverend John Ambrose Wood and Leonora Whitaker Wood. From the age of 9 until her graduation from high school, Marshall was raised in Keyser, West Virginia, where her father served as pastor of a Presbyterian church from 1924 to 1942.

While a junior at Agnes Scott College, she met Peter Marshall, marrying him in 1936. The couple moved to Washington, D.C., where her husband served as pastor of the New York Avenue Presbyterian Church and Chaplain of the United States Senate.

In 1940, Marshall contracted tuberculosis, for which at that time no antibiotic treatment was available. She spent nearly three years recovering from the illness. Her husband died in 1949 of a heart attack, leaving her to care for their 9-year-old son, Peter John Marshall. He later also became a minister and author.

Marshall wrote a biography of her husband, A Man Called Peter, published in 1951. It became a nationwide success and was adapted as a film of the same name, released in 1955. Her success encouraged her to keep writing.

Marshall wrote or edited more than 30 books, which have sold over 16 million copies. They include edited collections of Peter Marshall's sermons and prayers, and her own inspirational writings. Her most successful books were A Man Called Peter (1951); and her novel, Christy (1967), which was inspired by the story of her mother's time in the mountains teaching the impoverished children of Appalachia. Christy was adapted as a CBS television series, starring Kellie Martin, beginning in 1994.

In 1959, Marshall married Leonard LeSourd, who was the editor of Guideposts Magazine for 28 years. Together they founded a book imprint, Chosen Books. Marshall had three stepchildren, Linda, Chester and Jeffery.
 
Marshall died on March 18, 1983, at the age of 68. She was buried alongside her first husband.

Works published
A Closer Walk (co-author)
A Man Called Peter
Adventures in Prayer
Beyond Our Selves
Catherine Marshall's Story Bible
Catherine Marshall's Storybook for Children
Christy
Footprints in the Snow
Friends with God
God Loves You
Heart of Peter Marshall's Faith
John Doe, Disciple
Julie
Let's Keep Christmas
Light in my Darkest Night
Meeting God at Every Turn
Mr. Jones, Meet the Master (co-author)
Moments that Matter
My Personal Prayer Diary
Prayers of Peter Marshall
Quiet Times with Catherine Marshall
Something More
The Best of Catherine Marshall
The Best of Peter Marshall
The Collected Works of Catherine Marshall
The First Easter (co-author)
The Helper
The Inspirational Writings of Catherine Marshall
To Live Again

References

1914 births
1983 deaths
20th-century American novelists
Agnes Scott College people
American book editors
American evangelicals
American Presbyterians
American women novelists
Appalachian writers
Christian novelists
People from Johnson City, Tennessee
People from Keyser, West Virginia
Novelists from West Virginia
Novelists from Tennessee
20th-century American women writers